Marco Varnier (born 8 June 1998) is an Italian footballer who plays as a centre back for Serie B club SPAL, on loan from Atalanta.

Club career
Varnier made his professional debut with Cittadella on 30 December 2016, aged 18, in a Serie B match against Virtus Entella. He obtained 14 league appearances on his first professional season. On 25 November 2017 he scored his career's first goal in the league match won 2–1 against Salernitana.

On 2 July 2018, he joined Serie A club Atalanta on a season-long loan with Atalanta holding an obligation to buy his rights at the end of the 2018–19 season. During his second training with Atalanta, Varnier suffered anterior cruciate ligament injury in his right knee and was unable to make any appearances in his first season.

On 27 August 2019, Varnier joined Pisa on loan. After only 3 games, Varnier suffered anterior cruciate ligament injury in his left knee and missed most of the 2019–20 season.

On 3 July 2021, he moved to Como on a season-long loan.

Varnier joined SPAL on a season-long loan on 2 July 2022. The loan includes an option to buy and a conditional obligation to buy.

International career
He made his debut with the U21 team on 5 October 2017, in a friendly match won 6–2 against Hungary in Budapest.

References

External links
 

Living people
1998 births
Sportspeople from Padua
Association football central defenders
Italian footballers
A.S. Cittadella players
Atalanta B.C. players
Pisa S.C. players
Como 1907 players
S.P.A.L. players
Serie B players
Italy under-21 international footballers
Italy youth international footballers
Italian people of French descent
Footballers from Veneto